Macra is a comune (municipality) in the Province of Cuneo in the Italian region Piedmont, located about  southwest of Turin and about  northwest of Cuneo.

Macra borders the following municipalities: Celle di Macra, Marmora, Sampeyre, San Damiano Macra, and Stroppo.

References

Cities and towns in Piedmont